Pancrazio De Pasquale (1925–1992) was an Italian politician. From 1979–1989, he served as a Member of the European Parliament. He was a member of the Communist Party of Italy. From 1979–1989 he served as Chair of the Committee on Regional Policy and Regional Planning. He served in the Chamber of Deputies of Italy in Legislature III, Legislature IV and Legislature XI. He served as President of the Sicilian Regional Assembly.

References

1925 births
1992 deaths
Politicians from Messina
Italian Communist Party politicians
Communist Refoundation Party politicians
Deputies of Legislature III of Italy
Deputies of Legislature IV of Italy
Deputies of Legislature XI of Italy
Italian Communist Party MEPs
MEPs for Italy 1979–1984
MEPs for Italy 1984–1989
Presidents of the Sicilian Regional Assembly